Oxymeris suffusa is a species of sea snail, a marine gastropod mollusc in the family Terebridae, the auger snails.

Description
The size of the adult shell varies between 30 mm and 59 mm.

Distribution
This species occurs in the Pacific Ocean along Hawaii.

References

 Terryn Y. (2007). Terebridae: A Collectors Guide. Conchbooks & NaturalArt. 59pp + plates

External links
 

Terebridae
Gastropods described in 1889